Uriarra is a locality in the Southern Tablelands of New South Wales, Australia in the Yass Valley Shire. It is north of the locality of Uriarra in the Australian Capital Territory and north-west of Canberra. The locality is mostly located in the Urayarra parish of Cowley County, although part of it in Pabral parish, which lies further west.

References

Localities in New South Wales
Yass Valley Council
Southern Tablelands